Wandersleben is a village and a former municipality in the district of Gotha, in Thuringia, Germany. Since 1 January 2009, it is part of the municipality Drei Gleichen.

Former municipalities in Thuringia